Roderick Andrew Anthony Jude McDowall (17 September 1928 – 4 October 1998) was a British actor, photographer and film director. He began his acting career as a child in England, and then in the United States, in How Green Was My Valley (1941), My Friend Flicka (1943), and Lassie Come Home (1943).

For portraying Octavian in the historical drama Cleopatra (1963), he was nominated for a Golden Globe Award. He played Cornelius and Caesar in the original Planet of the Apes film series, as well as Galen in the spin-off television series.

Other notable films included The Longest Day (1962), The Greatest Story Ever Told (1965), That Darn Cat! (1965), Inside Daisy Clover (1965), Bedknobs and Broomsticks (1971), The Poseidon Adventure (1972), Funny Lady (1975), The Black Hole (1979), Class of 1984 (1982), Fright Night (1985), Overboard (1987) and A Bug's Life. He also provided the voice of Mad Hatter in the DC Animated Universe.

McDowall also served in various positions on the Board of Governors for the Academy of Motion Picture Arts and Sciences and the Selection Committee for the Kennedy Center Honors, further contributing to various charities related to the film industry and film preservation. He was a founding Member of the National Film Preservation Board in 1989, and represented the Screen Actors Guild on this Board until his death. His accolades included a Tony Award, an Emmy Award, a Saturn Award, and a National Board of Review Award.
For his contributions to the film and television industry, he received a star on the Hollywood Walk of Fame.

Biography

Early life
McDowall was born at 204 Herne Hill Road, Herne Hill, London, the only son of London-born Thomas Andrew McDowall (1896–1978), a merchant seaman of distant Scottish descent, and his Irish wife Winifred (née Corcoran). Both of his parents were enthusiastic about the theatre. He and his elder sister, Virginia, were raised in their mother's Catholic faith. He attended St Joseph's College, Beulah Hill, Upper Norwood, a Roman Catholic secondary school in London.

British films
Appearing as a child model as a baby, McDowall appeared in several films as a boy. After winning an acting prize in a school play at age nine, he started appearing in films: Murder in the Family (1938), I See Ice (1938) with George Formby, John Halifax (1938) and Scruffy (1938).

McDowall appeared in Convict 99 (1938) and Hey! Hey! USA (1938) with Will Hay, Yellow Sands (1938), The Outsider (1939), Murder Will Out (1939), Dead Man's Shoes (1940), Just William (1940), Saloon Bar (1940), You Will Remember (1941), and This England (1941).

Early US films
McDowall's family moved to the United States in 1940 after the outbreak of World War II. He became a naturalized United States citizen on 9 December 1949, and lived in the United States for the rest of his life. McDowall served in the 67th Armored Infantry Battalion Division of the U.S. Army Organized Reserve Corps (headquartered in Los Angeles) from 1946 to 1954, spanning the end of World War II to the Korean War. He later served in the 77th Infantry Division between 1960 to 1962.

McDowall's American career began with a part in the 1941 thriller Man Hunt, directed by Fritz Lang. It was made by 20th Century Fox who also produced McDowall's next film How Green Was My Valley (1941), where he met and became lifelong friends with actress Maureen O'Hara. The film won the Academy Award for Best Picture, and McDowall's role as Huw Morgan made him a household name.

Fox put him in another war film, Confirm or Deny (1941), then he played Tyrone Power as a boy in Son of Fury: The Story of Benjamin Blake (1942).

Stardom

Fox promoted McDowall to top billing for On the Sunny Side (1942). He was billed second to Monty Woolley in The Pied Piper (1942), playing a war orphan, then he had top billing again for an adaptation of My Friend Flicka (1942).

Metro-Goldwyn-Mayer borrowed McDowall for the star role in Lassie Come Home (1943), a film that introduced an actress who would become another lifelong friend, Elizabeth Taylor. MGM kept him on to play a leading role in The White Cliffs of Dover (1944).

Back at Fox he played Gregory Peck as a young man in The Keys of the Kingdom (1944). In 1944, exhibitors voted McDowall the number four "Star of Tomorrow".

Fox gave McDowall another starring vehicle, Thunderhead – Son of Flicka (1945). They reunited him with Woolley in Molly and Me (1945), which was made as an attempt to turn Gracie Fields into a Hollywood star.

McDowall went back to MGM to support Walter Pidgeon in Holiday in Mexico (1946).

Theatre
McDowall turned to the theatre, taking the title role of Young Woodley in a summer stock production in Westport, Connecticut in July 1946.

In 1947, he played Malcolm in Orson Welles's stage production of Macbeth in Salt Lake City, and played the same role in the actor-director's film version in 1948.

Monogram Pictures

McDowall then signed a three-year contract with Monogram Pictures, a low-budget studio that welcomed established stars, to make two films a year.

McDowall starred in seven films for them, for which he also worked as associate producer: Rocky (1948), a boy and dog story directed by Phil Karlson; Kidnapped (1948), an adaptation of the Robert Louis Stevenson story, where he played David Balfour, directed by William Beaudine; Tuna Clipper (1949), a fishing tale, again directed by Beaudine; Black Midnight (1949), a horse story directed by Budd Boetticher; Killer Shark (1950), a shark hunting tale, again with Boetticher; Big Timber (1950), as a logger; The Steel Fist (1952), an anti-communist drama.

1950s: Television and theatre
McDowall left Hollywood to relocate to New York City. He began appearing on television, notably shows like Celanese Theatre, Broadway Television Theatre, Medallion Theatre, Campbell Summer Soundstage, Armstrong Circle Theatre, Encounter, Robert Montgomery Presents (including an adaptation of Great Expectations where he played Pip), The Elgin Hour, Ponds Theater, General Electric Theater, The Kaiser Aluminum Hour, Lux Video Theatre, Goodyear Playhouse, The Alcoa Hour, Kraft Theatre, Matinee Theatre, Suspicion, Playhouse 90 (in an adaptation of Heart of Darkness), The United States Steel Hour, The DuPont Show of the Month (an adaptation of Billy Budd) and The Twilight Zone (the episode "People Are Alike All Over").

McDowall also had significant success on the Broadway stage. He was in a production of Misalliance (1953) that ran for 130 performances and which McDowall said "broke the mould" in how he was judged as an actor.

He followed it with Escapade (1953) with Carroll Baker and Brian Aherne; Ira Levin's No Time for Sergeants  (1955–57), which was a huge hit; Diary of a Scoundrel (1956); and Good as Gold (1957).

He had a big critical success with Compulsion (1957–58) based on Leopold and Loeb – although McDowall was not cast in the film version. He followed it with Handful of Fire (1958), Noël Coward's Look After Lulu! (1959) and Peter Brook's The Fighting Cock (1960). The latter earned him a Tony Award.

1960: Return to Hollywood

McDowall was in another big Broadway hit when he played Mordred in the musical Camelot (1960–63) with Julie Andrews and Richard Burton.

He played Ariel in a TV production of The Tempest (1960) with Richard Burton and Maurice Evans, then appeared in his first film in almost a decade, The Subterraneans (1960). He followed it with Midnight Lace (1960).

McDowall continued to work on television in shows such as Sunday Showcase, Naked City, and Play of the Week.  He was in a TV production of The Power and the Glory (1961) with Laurence Olivier, George C. Scott and Julie Harris.

In 1963, McDowall appeared as Octavian in the film production of Cleopatra, which starred Elizabeth Taylor. While filming in Europe, he appeared in Fox's war film The Longest Day (1963). He continued to guest on television series such as Arrest and Trial, The Alfred Hitchcock Hour, The Eleventh Hour, Kraft Suspense Theatre, Combat!, Ben Casey, Twelve O'Clock High, Run for Your Life, The Invaders, and appeared as a Special Guest Villain as The Bookworm on Batman.

He had supporting roles in Fox's Shock Treatment (1964) and United Artists' The Greatest Story Ever Told (1965). He was third billed in The Third Day (1965) and received billing as a member of the ensemble cast in The Loved One (1965). McDowall went to Disney for That Darn Cat! (1965) and had a role in Inside Daisy Clover (1965).

McDowall was given a starring role in Lord Love a Duck (1966). He also appeared in The Defector (1966) and returned briefly to Broadway for The Astrakhan Coat (1967).

Disney gave him the star role in The Adventures of Bullwhip Griffin (1967) and he was top billed in The Cool Ones (1967) and It! (1967). He was in a TV production of Saint Joan (1967) and provided the voice for Cricket on the Hearth (1967). He guest-starred in the series The Felony Squad.

In 1968, McDowall appeared in one of his memorable roles when he was cast in Planet of the Apes as the ape Cornelius. He would later go on to appear in three sequels and a TV spin-off from the film.

He was Prince John in The Legend of Robin Hood (1968) for TV, and appeared in 5 Card Stud (1968), Journey to the Unknown, It Takes a Thief, Midas Run (1969), Hello Down There (1969), Angel, Angel, Down We Go (1969), Night Gallery (1969), The Name of the Game and Medical Center.

1970s
McDowall made his debut as director with The Ballad of Tam Lin (1970).

As an actor he was in Pretty Maids All in a Row (1971). McDowall was not in the first Apes sequel but was in the second, Escape from the Planet of the Apes (1971). He was in the television film Terror in the Sky (1971),  What's a Nice Girl Like You...? (1971) and A Taste of Evil (1971) and Disney's Bedknobs and Broomsticks (1971).

He guest starred on Ironside, The Carol Burnett Show, Columbo (1972, "Short Fuse"), The Delphi Bureau, The Rookies, Mission: Impossible, Barnaby Jones and McCloud.

McDowall made his third Apes film with 1972's Conquest of the Planet of the Apes. He had supporting roles in The Life and Times of Judge Roy Bean (1972) and The Poseidon Adventure (1972) and starred in a pilot that did not go to series, Topper Returns (1973), and The Legend of Hell House (1973).

His final Apes film was Battle for the Planet of the Apes (1973). He also appeared in McMillan & Wife, Love, American Style, Arnold (1973), a remake of Miracle on 34th Street (1973), The Elevator (1974), and The Snoop Sisters also (1974) an uncredited cameo appearance as a grocery store manager in the film Dirty Mary Crazy Larry.

He starred in the short lived TV spin-off series of Planet of the Apes (1974). During a guest appearance on The Carol Burnett Show, he came onstage in his Planet of the Apes makeup and performed a love duet with Burnett.

Asked about his career in a 1975 interview, McDowall said "I just hope to keep working and in interesting things."

Late 1970s
For the rest of the 1970s, McDowall alternated between features, TV films and TV series. Features included Funny Lady (1975), Mean Johnny Barrows (1976), Embryo (1976), Sixth and Main (1977), Laserblast (1978), Rabbit Test (1978), The Cat from Outer Space (1978) for Disney, Circle of Iron (1978), Scavenger Hunt (1979), Nutcracker Fantasy (1979) (doing voice over for the English language edition), and Disney's The Black Hole (1979) in which he voiced one of the robot roles.

TV series included Police Woman, Mowgli's Brothers, Harry O, The Feather and Father Gang, Wonder Woman, Flying High, The Love Boat, $weepstake$, Supertrain, Hart to Hart, A Man Called Sloane, Trapper John, M.D. (the pilot episode), Buck Rogers in the 25th Century ("Planet of the Slave Girls") and Mork & Mindy. He also had a regular role in the short-lived sci-fi series The Fantastic Journey (1977).

TV films included Flood! (1977), The Rhinemann Exchange (1978), The Immigrants (1978), and The Thief of Baghdad (1978).

Early 1980s
McDowall's TV film /mini-series work in the 1980s included The Martian Chronicles (1980), The Memory of Eva Ryker (1980), The Return of the King (1980) (on which he did voice over work), The Million Dollar Face (1981), Judgement Day (1981), Twilight Theatre (1982), Mae West (1982), This Girl for Hire (1983), The Zany Adventures of Robin Hood (1984), '[London and Davis in New York (1984), Hollywood Wives (1985), and Alice in Wonderland (1985).

TV series included Boomer and Miss 21st Century, Fantasy Island (several times), Faerie Tale Theatre, Tales of the Gold Monkey (a series regular), Small and Frye, Hotel, and George Burns Comedy Week.

McDowall's features included Charlie Chan and the Curse of the Dragon Queen (1981), Evil Under the Sun (1982), Class of 1984 (1984), and the cult classic horror Fright Night (1985).

Voice-over work and late 1980s
McDowall began to play many voice over roles, such as Zoo Ship (1985), GoBots: Battle of the Rock Lords (1986), and The Wind in the Willows (1987). TV series included Bridges to Cross (1986) (in which McDowall was a regular), The Wizard, Murder, She Wrote, Matlock, and Nightmare Classics, and TV films included Remo Williams: The Prophecy and Around the World in 80 Days (1989).

In 1987, he had supporting roles in Dead of Winter and Overboard, on which he also served as executive producer. Other features included Doin' Time on Planet Earth (1988), Fright Night Part 2 (1989), The Big Picture (1989), Cutting Class (1989), and Heroes Stand Alone (1989).

In 1989, he said "I feel as Henry Fonda did that every job I get may be my last. I'm one of those creatures born to be working. I feel better when I'm working. I don't like it when I'm not working and I've never worked as much as I want to."

1990s

McDowall's 1990s work included The Color of Evening (1990), Shakma (1990), Going Under (1990), An Inconvenient Woman (1991), Earth Angel (1991), Deadly Game (1991), The Naked Target (1992), Double Trouble (1992), The New Lassie (1992), Quantum Leap (A Leap for Lisa) (1992), The Evil Inside Me (1993), I Strahd: The Memoirs of a Vampaire (1993 audio book), Dream On, Heads (1994), Hart to Hart: Home Is Where the Hart Is (1994), Mirror, Mirror 2: Raven Dance (1994), Burke's Law, Angel 4: Undercover (1994), The Alien Within (1995), The Grass Harp (1995), Last Summer in the Hamptons (1995), Bullet Hearts (1996), Star Hunter (1996), It's My Party (1996), Tracey Takes On..., Dead Man's Island, Remember WENN, Unlikely Angel (1996), The Second Jungle Book: Mowgli & Baloo (1997), Something to Believe In (1998), and Loss of Faith (1998).

He did voices for The Pirates of Dark Water (1991–92), Timmy's Gift: A Precious Moments Christmas (1992), Camp Candy, The Legend of Prince Valiant (1992), Darkwing Duck (1992), 2 Stupid Dogs, Swat Kats: The Radical Squadron, Batman: The Animated Series, Red Planet, The Tick, Galaxy Beat, Gargoyles, Duckman, Pinky and the Brain, The New Batman Adventures, Superman, A Bug's Life (1998), and Godzilla: The Series.

He was the subject of This Is Your Life in 1993, when he was surprised by Michael Aspel at the Pacific Design Center in West Hollywood.

In 1997, McDowall hosted the MGM Musicals Tribute at Carnegie Hall.

Academy of Motion Picture Arts and Sciences
McDowall served for several years in various capacities on the Board of Governors of the Academy of Motion Picture Arts and Sciences, the organisation that presents the Oscar Awards, and on the selection committee for the Kennedy Center Awards. He was Chairman of the Actors' Branch for five terms. He was elected President of the Academy Foundation in 1998, the year that he died. He worked to support the Motion Pictures Retirement Home, where a rose garden named in his honour was officially dedicated on 9 October 2001 and remains a part of the campus.

Photographer and author
McDowall received recognition as a photographer, working with Look, Vogue, Collier's, and Life. His work includes a cover story on Mae West for Life and the cover of the  1964 Barbra Streisand album, The Third Album. He took the photograph when Streisand performed on The Judy Garland Show in October, 1963.

He published five books of photographs, each featuring photos and profile interviews of his celebrity friends interviewing each other, such as Elizabeth Taylor, Judy Garland, Judy Holliday, Maureen O'Hara, Katharine Hepburn, Lauren Bacall, and others. It started with Double Exposure in 1968.

Personal life
McDowall was a Democrat and was supportive of Adlai Stevenson's campaign during the 1952 presidential election.

In 1974, the FBI raided McDowall's home and seized his collection of films and television series in the course of an investigation into film piracy and copyright infringement. His collection consisted of 160 16-mm prints and more than 1,000 video cassettes, at a time before the era of commercial videotapes, when there was no legal aftermarket for films. McDowall had purchased Errol Flynn's home cinema films and transferred them all to tape for longer-lasting archival storage. No charges were filed.

McDowall never married or had children. In Full Service: My Adventures in Hollywood and the Secret Sex Lives of the Stars (2012) by Scotty Bowers, a famous Hollywood procurer, Bowers claims McDowall was one of his homosexual clients.

McDowall was in a relationship with American actor Montgomery Clift for several years in the early 1950s.Montgomery Clift: A Biography, Bosworth, Patricia, p. 281

Death
On 3 October 1998, at age 70, McDowall died of lung cancer at his home in Studio City, California. His body was cremated and his ashes were scattered into the Pacific Ocean on 7 October 1998 off Los Angeles County. Dennis Osborne, a screenwriter, had cared for McDowall in his final months, and was quoted as saying, "It was very peaceful. It was just as he wanted it. It was exactly the way he planned."

Filmography
Film

Television

StageYoung Woodley (1946)Macbeth (1947)
 Misalliance (1953)
 Escapade (1953)
 Julius Caesar (1955)
 The Tempest (1955)

 No Time for Sergeants (1955)
 Good as Gold (1957)
 Compulsion (1957)
 Handful of Fire (1958)
 Look After Lulu (1959)

 The Fighting Cock (1959)
 Camelot (1960)
 The Astrakhan Coat (1967)
 Charlie's Aunt (1975)
 Dial M for Murder (1995–1996)
 A Christmas Carol: The Musical (1997)

Radio appearances

References

Bibliography
 Best, Marc. Those Endearing Young Charms: Child Performers of the Screen (South Brunswick and New York: Barnes & Co., 1971), pp. 176–181.
 Dye, David. Child and Youth Actors: Filmography of Their Entire Careers, 1914–1985. Jefferson, North Carolina: McFarland & Co., 1988, pp. 140–144.
 Holmstrom, John. The Moving Picture Boy: An International Encyclopaedia from 1895 to 1995'', Norwich, Michael Russell, 1996, pp. 158–159.

External links

 
 
 
 
 
 xmoppet.org – tribute site with career and biographical information, image gallery, sound clips, links, articles, US TV guide, and a fan club with mailing list
 Documents from the 1974 FBI Raid
 The Roddy McDowall Collection, Howard Gotlieb Archival Research Center, Boston University
 Image of Roddy McDowall, Julie Andrews and Greer Garson at the premiere of "The Greatest Story Ever Told" in Los Angeles, California, 1965. Los Angeles Times Photographic Archive (Collection 1429). UCLA Library Special Collections, Charles E. Young Research Library, University of California, Los Angeles.

1928 births
1998 deaths
American gay actors
American Roman Catholics
Audiobook narrators
California Democrats
Deaths from lung cancer in California
English emigrants to the United States
English film directors
English male child actors
English male film actors
English male stage actors
English male Shakespearean actors
English male television actors
English male voice actors
English people of Scottish descent
LGBT film directors
English people of Irish descent
English Roman Catholics
Film directors from Los Angeles
Male actors from London
English gay actors
Naturalized citizens of the United States
Outstanding Performance by a Supporting Actor in a Drama Series Primetime Emmy Award winners
People from Herne Hill
People from Studio City, Los Angeles
Tony Award winners
20th-century American male actors
20th-century English male actors
20th Century Studios contract players